Draško Albijanić (born December 14, 1986) is a Bosnian professional basketball player who last played for Spars Sarajevo of the Bosnian League.

References

External links
 Eurobasket.com Profile
 FIBA.com Profile
 RealGM.com Profile
 BeoExcell Agency Profile

1986 births
Living people
ABA League players
Centers (basketball)
CSU Asesoft Ploiești players
Bosnia and Herzegovina expatriate basketball people in Romania
Bosnia and Herzegovina expatriate basketball people in Serbia
Bosnia and Herzegovina men's basketball players
KK Borac Čačak players
KK Igokea players
KK Leotar players
KK Lovćen players
KK Sloboda Tuzla players
KK Sutjeska players
OKK Spars players
OKK Borac players
People from Trebinje
Serbs of Bosnia and Herzegovina